Mohammed Al Herz is a Saudi poet and critic, born in Bahrain in 1967. He was known for his critical work regarding the Kingdom of Saudi Arabia's cultural landscape and its transformations which followed. He published several collections of poetry and critical writings including (The Stone and Shadows: Poetry and Narration Reading Laboratory) and Diwan (A Man Looks Like Me).

Work 

 Member of the Al Ahsa Literary Council.

References 

Living people
Saudi Arabian male writers
1967 births
Male poets
20th-century Saudi Arabian poets
20th-century male writers
21st-century Saudi Arabian poets
21st-century male writers